Neiphiu Guolhoulie Rio (born 11 November 1950) is an Indian politician who serving as the 9th and current Chief Minister of Nagaland since 2018, previously 2008 to 2014 and from 2003 to 2008. He is the only Nagaland Chief Minister to have served five consecutive terms, and is the longest serving Chief Minister of Nagaland. He was also a Member of Parliament from Nagaland in Lok Sabha from 2014 to 2018.

Early life and education 
Neiphiu Guolhoulie Rio was born on 11 November 1950 to an Angami Naga family from Tuophema. His mother and father were Kevilhouü and Guolhoulie Rio. He received his early education from Baptist English School, Kohima and Sainik School, Purulia, West Bengal. He attended college at St Joseph's College, Darjeeling and later graduated from Kohima Arts College.

An active student leader during his School and College days, Rio entered politics at a very young age. He had headed many organizations before becoming the Chief Minister of Nagaland. He served as the President of Kohima District United Democratic Front (UDF) Youth Wing in 1974. He was also appointed  the Chairman of Northern Angami Area Council in 1984. He also had been the honorary Vice President of Indian Red Cross Society Nagaland branch.

Political career 
On entering politics, Rio was first elected to Nagaland Legislative Assembly as Congress (I) candidate from the Northern Angami-II constituency during the 7th General Elections of 1989. He was appointed the Minister for Sports and School Education and subsequently as Minister for Higher & Technical Education and Art & Culture; also served as Chairman in Nagaland Industrial Development Corporation, Nagaland Khadi & Village Industries Board and Development Authority of Nagaland. Rio was again elected from the same Constituency in 1993 as Congress (I) candidate and appointed Minister for Works & Housing. As a member of the Indian National Congress, Rio was Nagaland's Home Minister as part of the cabinet headed by S. C. Jamir from 1998 till 2002 when he resigned from the ministry accusing Chief Minister S. C. Jamir of blocking a negotiated settlement of the vexed Naga issue.

After his resignation, Rio joined Naga People's Front which partnered with other Naga regionalist parties and the state branch of the Bharatiya Janata Party (BJP) under his leadership to form the Democratic Alliance of Nagaland (DAN), a coalition which won the 2003 state elections, bringing the 10-year-long rule of the Indian National Congress in the state to an end. Rio subsequently took office as Chief Minister on 6 March 2003.

Before completing his first term, Rio was dismissed as Chief Minister when President's Rule was imposed in Nagaland on 3 January 2008. However, his party emerged as the single largest party in the ensuing elections and Rio, as the leader of DAN, was invited by the state Governor to form the government on 12 March 2008. During the 2013 Nagaland State elections, NPF won a thumping majority and Rio was re-elected as Chief Minister for a third term.

At a memorial service in Kohima for the victims of 2021 Nagaland killings, Rio said "I am hopeful that the country and the rest of the world will not only understand the Nagas’ story but also the want for lasting peace."

Achievements 

Rio has played a key role in setting up the Music Task Force, the first music industry in the country. He was awarded The Mother Teresa Millennium award, for his outstanding leadership and contributions to politics in Kolkata in the year 2007.

Personal life 
Rio is married to Kaisa Rio. Together they have five daughters and one son. His brother Zhaleo Rio was elected to Nagaland Assembly in 2013 and 2019 from Ghaspani II Constituency and was the Deputy Speaker of the assembly in 2018. His mother Kevilhouü Rio died on 1 January 2020, at the age of 92. His father had died 30 years before his mother's death.

See also

 Neiphiu Rio Fourth ministry

References

External links
 Profile at Nagaland NIC.
 
Neiphiu Rio extends ‘best wishes’ to Khrievitso Kense, youngest player shortlisted for IPL auction

|-

|-

|-

1950 births
Living people
Naga people
Chief Ministers of Nagaland
Sainik School alumni
People from Kohima district
 People from Kohima
India MPs 2014–2019
Lok Sabha members from Nagaland
Naga People's Front politicians
Nationalist Democratic Progressive Party
Nationalist Democratic Progressive Party politicians
Chief ministers from Naga People's Front politicians
Indian National Congress politicians from Nagaland
Nagaland MLAs 1998–2003
Nagaland MLAs 2003–2008
Nagaland MLAs 2008–2013
Nagaland MLAs 2013–2018
Nagaland MLAs 2018–2023